Halpe porus, commonly known as Moore's ace, is a species of butterfly in the family Hesperiidae, found in India.

Description

The larvae feed on Bambusa striata and Ochlandra scriptoria.

References

Astictopterini
Butterflies of Asia